The Great Fall River fire of 1928 occurred on February 2–3, 1928 and destroyed a vast portion of downtown Fall River, Massachusetts. Although the city has had many other large fires, both before and after, the 1928 conflagration is generally considered the worst in the city's history, since it destroyed so many businesses at a time when the city's economy was already struggling from recent textile plant closings. By the time the fire was out, five city blocks were completely wiped out. Nobody was killed and only a few people suffered serious injuries.

The blaze
At 5:45 p.m. on February 2, 1928, the fire broke out in Mill No. 2 of the Pocasset Manufacturing Company on Pocasset Street. 
It was a bitter cold evening and demolition workers had been dismantling the recently shuttered mills. The flames spread quickly through the mill complex. Within an hour, Fire Chief Jeremiah F. Sullivan sounded three alarms and called for outside help. By about 7:00 p.m. fire apparatus and departments from surrounding towns and as far away as Boston and Lowell would arrive to provide assistance.

A brisk southwest wind caused the flames to cross Central Street and hampered fire suppression. The wind shifted again to the west, spreading the fire across North Main Street. The wind shifted again to the northwest and drove the fire across Bedford Street.  Temperatures hit a record low mark for the season, causing the fire hoses to freeze and hampering the efforts of the firemen.

At 2:30 a.m. the fire was declared under control. City Hall was damaged but had been saved. Various buildings in scattered sections of the area were still burning though.

It was not until Saturday noon, nearly two days after its start, that the fire was officially declared out. Police, National Guardsmen and Naval Reservists also provided assistance with securing the fire damaged areas.

Total damage was estimated at $20,000,000, although the actual amount was widely disputed by local businessmen. The cause of the blaze was determined to have started with a spark from a salamander heater being used by the demolition crew to keep warm.

Within just a few years, many of the banks and commercial businesses were rebuilt, including the Granite Block, at the heart of the business district.

Buildings destroyed
Five banks, three theaters, three hotels, two newspaper plants, twelve office buildings, a Jewish temple and a half dozen lunch rooms were destroyed.

Damaged buildings

Selection of companies damaged

References

Fires in Massachusetts
Industrial fires and explosions in the United States
Fall River, Massachusetts
History of Bristol County, Massachusetts
1928 in Massachusetts
1928 fires in the United States
February 1928 events
Urban fires in the United States
1928 disasters in the United States